Salomon Mesdach (c. 1600 – 1632), was a Dutch Golden Age painter.

Biography	
Salomon lived and worked in Middelburg, where he is known for portraits. Some of his portraits were later engraved.

References

External links 
Salomon Mesdach on Artnet	
	
	
	
	
	
1600s births	
1632 deaths	
Dutch Golden Age painters
Dutch male painters	
Painters from Middelburg